Crier is a surname. Notable people with the surname include:

 Arthur Crier, part of the band The Halos
 Catherine Crier (born 1954), American television anchor
 Gordon Crier (1912 - 1984), Scottish writer/producer
 Keith Crier, part of the band GQ

See also 
Cryer

English-language surnames